Carrie Dodd (née Busch; born May 19, 1974) is a professional beach volleyball player from the United States who plays on the AVP Tour.  Dodd played volleyball at the University of Texas. She competed at the 1999 Pan American Games.

References

1974 births
Living people
American women's beach volleyball players
Beach volleyball players at the 1999 Pan American Games
Pan American Games competitors for the United States
Sportspeople from Milwaukee
21st-century American women
Texas Longhorns women's volleyball players